Dominique Rijpma van Hulst (born 7 September 1981) is a Dutch singer and actress known by her stage name Do. She is best known for singing the vocals of "Heaven", DJ Sammy's worldwide top 10-hit in 2002–2003, a cover of the 1980s hit of the same name by Bryan Adams.

Early life
Dominique Rijpma van Hulst was born in 1981 in Valkenswaard, Netherlands. She was raised by her stepfather Willem-Jan van Hulst, a popular tennis coach.  At age fifteen, she planned to compete in Wimbledon, but an injury ended her tennis career.

Her first musical performance was in café Old Dutch in Valkenswaard, which led to a record label deal with Sony Music BMG.

Music 
Before she even released a single, she was a supporting act for the tour of 5ive and Montell Jordan in the Netherlands.
The first single Do released was the song "Real Good". Although the music video was played a lot on the Dutch music channel TMF, it was not a hit song in the Netherlands. Later in an interview, she says that "It wasn't my sound, and I hated the video. Thankfully it wasn't a hit, 'cause I don't want people to remember me from that song".
After that, Do collaborated with DJ Sammy and Yanou, who is also her producer. The song was a cover of Bryan Adams song Heaven. It became an international hit. It reached the number one spot in the United Kingdom and was a Top ten hit in several countries. A candlelight remix version was made with a slower, piano instrumental. During this time, she had some problems with the credits of the song. Everywhere she went, she was asked if she was DJ Sammy because the song (in accordance with most dance songs) was credited to DJ Sammy, and she was the main focus in the video. Her candlelight version of "Heaven" is also used for the ending sequence of the TV series Cold Case, 1st-season episode 8 'Fly Away'.

Do
Do's self-titled debut, Do, was released in 2004, and reached No. 3 in the Netherlands. The first single from the album, "Voorbij", a duet with Marco Borsato, reached No. 1. She also had top-ten hits in the Netherlands with her next two singles, "Love Is Killing Me" (which reached the No. 6) and "Angel by My Side" (which reached No. 10). The fourth single was planned to be a cover of the Cyndi Lauper song "I Don't Want to Be Your Friend". The plan fell through - Do's management did not get the rights to release it as a single. The album received the Gold status (40,000 copies) in the Netherlands. To end the year, she recorded a Christmas song with Trijntje Oosterhuis on the order of Sky Radio. It was called "Everyday Is Christmas". Due to the airplay it reached No. 7 in the Dutch Top 40.

After the tsunami disaster in Indonesia, Do joined several Dutch artists to record a song for the victims of the tsunami. The song, "Als Je Iets Kan Doen" (If You Can Do Something), reached No. 1 in the Netherlands and stayed there for several weeks. All of the profits from the song went to the victims of the tsunami disaster.

Follow Me
Do's second album, Follow Me, was released in the Netherlands on 19 June 2006. The first single was also called "Follow Me". The song was written by Bryan Adams and had already been recorded by Melanie C in 1999. The single peaked at No. 39 in the Dutch Top 40 but did better in the Megacharts Top 50, peaking at No. 17. The album debuted in the Dutch Megacharts Album Top 100 at No. 8 and peaked there for two weeks. The album contains 12 songs. The album meant a lot to Do, whose friend worked on the album with her before passing away.

The second single from Follow Me was "Beautiful Thing". This song did better in the charts than "Follow Me" and it peaked at No. 23. It stayed in the Top 40 for 9 weeks. The video for "Beautiful Thing" was shot in Bonaire just like the third single of the album "Sending Me Roses" which was only released as a digital track. The two videos form a story.

In 2006, Do did a tour called Follow Me theater tour.

The fourth single from the album was "I Will". It was released in February 2007. The song was re-recorded in Sweden. However, no video was made and the song failed to chart.

Do has also had a Dutch EP, entitled "Zingen in het Donker". (Singing in the Darkness.) The self-titled song was recorded in 4 different languages. (Dutch, English, German and French.) The proceeds were sent to a charity for Domestic Violence victims.

On 20 December 2009, Do premiered a new song, called "Nobody But Me", which was said to be off her upcoming album. Dominique Rijpma van Hulst stated the album was going to be released around March 2010; however, it has yet to be released.

In 2010, Dominique Rijpma van Hulst released an LP version of "Zingen in het Donker". (Singing in the Darkness) It had a very limited release in Europe, and only available on the European iTunes Store. The album contains 10 tracks from DO, and unlike her previous albums, "Zingen in her Donker" is completely in Dutch. The first single is titled after the name of the album.

Cinderella

From November 2007 to March 2008, Do starred in Assepoester, a Dutch version of Cinderella, as the title character. The production was held at the Efteling Theatre, a theatre in the Efteling amusement park in the Netherlands. It was Do's first live theatrical performance.

Personal life
On 7 July 2007, Do married Marc Verschoor in Barcelona. The couple divorced in 2010 but reconciled in 2012. She gave birth to a son on 2 January 2014. Do posed nude in, and was featured on the cover of, the January 2009 issue of the Dutch edition of Playboy.

Discography

Albums

Singles

As lead artist

Collaborations

Awards and nominations

Notes

References

External links

 

1981 births
Living people
Dutch dance musicians
People from Valkenswaard
Sony BMG artists
World Music Awards winners
21st-century Dutch singers
21st-century Dutch women singers